The Aero A.30 was a biplane light bomber and reconnaissance aircraft built in Czechoslovakia in the late 1920s. It originated as an attempt by Aero to improve the performance of the Aero A.11, but soon evolved into quite a different aircraft, larger and more powerful than its predecessor. The aircraft is readily distinguished from other related types by the difference in spans between its wings – the upper set being of much greater span than the lower.

Prototypes of the A.30 were retrospectively designated A.130, with the A.230 the main production version. The A.330 and A.430 featured different, more powerful engines, but the latter of these did not enter production, serving instead as the prototype for the Aero A.100.

Variants
A.30Prototype of a light bomber reconnaissance aircraft, powered by a  Skoda L radial engine.
A.32Also derived from the A.11, the A.32 was a light reconnaissance bomber powered by a  Walter Jupiter; 116 aircraft built in several versions. Finnish Air Force examples were powered by  Isotta-Fraschini Asso 500 V-12 engines
A.130Re-engined with a  Bristol Jupiter VI.
A.230The main production variant; a two-seat bomber powered by a Lorraine 12Eb Courlis W-12 engine.
A.330Re-engined with a  Praga ESV
A.430Powered by an Avia Vr-36, the A,430 served as the prototype of the Aero A.100
A.100

Operators

Czechoslovak Air Force
 Iran
Imperial Iranian Air Force purchased one Aero A.30 from Czechoslovakia in 1923

Specifications (A.230)

See also

References

Further reading

 
 

1920s Czechoslovakian bomber aircraft
1920s Czechoslovakian military reconnaissance aircraft
A030
Single-engined tractor aircraft
Biplanes